The Nueva Granada Military University, also called UMNG, is a public, private, self-funded, national, coeducational university based in the city of Bogotá, Colombia. The university has 8 faculties, 20 undergraduate, 66 graduate programs, 9 master's degrees, 44 Diploma and 52 research programs. The university offers academic programs for part-time (also referred as "distance") education, being one of the most important nationally.

In 2005 the university acquired a campus of 80 hectare in Cajicá being the third largest Latin American, this campus is being used to build new facilities for the university in order to house almost more than 30,000 students. This campus will have new high-tech buildings, rooms, laboratories, auditoriums, cafeterias, sports courts and a swimming pool. Likewise the Nueva Granada Military university acquired rights for the students to travel to campus in the Savannah train at no cost.

Characteristics and location

The university currently has three branches. Headquarters is located in Bogotá, at the junction of the hundred street with race Once, and the Faculty of medicine is located next to the Central Military Hospital in the transverse third with street forty and nine equally in the city of Bogotá. A new campus is under construction on the outskirts of the city of Cajicá

History 

The history of the university can be traced to 1962 when the Military School of Officers "José María Cordova" started offering Civil Engineering, Economics and Law programs to the second lieutenants of the institution supplementary to the last two years of their professional education. In 1978, as a result of the idealistic conception of a sector of the medical staff at the Central Military Hospital, the School of Medicine and Health Sciences was founded, beginning its labor in the first semester of 1979.

The university starts its development in full in 1980 when the decree-law 84/80 was issued granting the institution with the status of a university center, a special administrative unit ascribed to the Ministry of Defense. Its directorate was set up on the grounds of the Military School, the academic under direction in an old house in front of the Patria High School, and the administrative under direction in offices located at the Military School of Medicine.

Resolution 12975 of July 23, 1982 recognized the center as a university under the name of Universidad Militar “Nueva Granada”. ACT 30 of 1992, by means of which the public education is ruled, in its article 137 stated that the Universidad Militar “Nueva Granada” which provides higher education programs, shall continue ascribed to the corresponding entity - Ministry of National Defense - and shall work in accordance to its legal status - Special Administrative Unit - adjusting its academic regime to the terms of the aforementioned law.

In January 1984, the university moved to its present location in Bogotá, Colombia (carrera 11 No. 101-80), a strategic area of the city, where a financial center of prime importance emerges, as well as other entities of the defense sector.

As of March 2003, through ACT 805 of said year, the university modifies its legal status constituting itself as an autonomous university entity of a national order with a special organic regime, whose main goal deals with higher education geared to academically support the Military Forces, the National Police and the Defense Sector, and all its active or retired members, their families and the civilians in general.

Faculties and departments 

Faculty of Engineering
Mechatronics Engineering
Civil Engineering
Multimedia Engineering
Telecommunication Engineering
Industrial Engineering
Electronics and Communications Technology
Faculty of Economic Sciences
Business Administration
Public accounting
Technology in Accounting and Tax
Economy
School of International Relations and Security Strategy
International Relations and Political Studies
Administration of Occupational Safety and Health
Faculty of Law
Law
Faculty of Medicine
Medicine and Health Sciences,
Premedical
Faculty of Science
Applied biology
Horticulture Technology,
Master of Applied Biology.
Faculty of education and Humanities
Bioetica clinical and social
Education
University teaching
Scientific research Metologia
Faculty of distance studies
Business Administration
Public accounting
International relations
Civil Engineering
Industrial Engineering

Campus 

In 2005 New Granada Military University purchased a lot adjacent to the Hacienda Riogrande, areas for the construction of a campus for new generations of Colombians. With the75.5 acre campus is expected to become the third-largest in Latin America.

Apart from administrative buildings and schools which have own Auditorium, internet room, classrooms and cafeterias, contemplates the execution of special buildings which are inserted to the educational work of the University according to the requirements of each program and to the preferences of each student. These buildings include: Church, Sports Center, library, main auditorium, headquarters, Aquatics Center, gym, IMA (Institute military aeronautical), concha acoustic circuit athletic Stadium, pitch softball, treatment plant sewage treatment of groundwater, solid waste treatment plant, plant treatment of waters of the Bogotá River, power plant, etc.)

Publications and media 

With the goal of expanding and diversifying access to knowledge, the UMNG has their own publications, such as the Neogranadine newspaper, In addition to his own books and indexed journals that makes available to the public. The military University also has its own station transmitting via the Internet for public access, it can be heard on the http://radio.umng.edu.co/ website every day.

See also

 List of universities in Colombia

Notes

External links
Universidad Militar Nueva Granada official site 
The University official site (English)

Universities and colleges in Colombia